F1 2012 is a video game developed by Codemasters based on the 2012 Formula One season. The game was announced on 18 March 2012, co-inciding with the first race of the 2012 season. The game was released in September. It uses the EGO Engine. This was also the first game by Codemasters released under their "Codemasters Racing" label, which was used until 2016.

The Mac OS X version of the game was released by Feral Interactive on 20 December.

Features
The game features all twelve teams and twenty-four drivers competing in the 2012 season (except for mid-season changes), as well as the twenty circuits and Grands Prix — including the brand new Circuit of the Americas in Austin, Texas — included in the championship.

The game also features a brand-new "Young Driver Test" mode, a tutorial mode designed to introduce new players to the handling characteristics of Formula One cars as a prologue to the career mode. As a demonstration, Codemasters approached several drivers — including Mercedes test driver Sam Bird and GP2 Series driver Stefano Coletti — at the real-life Young Driver Tests (for drivers who have never started a Grand Prix) in Abu Dhabi in November 2011, and asked them to drive the Yas Marina Circuit in F1 2012 instead of using the team simulators they would traditionally use to learn the circuit. All of the drivers who played the game reported that the game was realistic enough for them to learn the circuit to the point where they were confident enough to set competitive lap times.

The game also presents a new main menu, with Codemasters saying it is now easier to navigate around the video game. The sound system has been modified, and players can now hear other cars around them.

Gameplay and modes
As well as the new young driver test mode, F1 2012  features a new "Champions Mode", in which the six World Champions competing in the 2012 season — Kimi Räikkönen, Lewis Hamilton, Jenson Button, Sebastian Vettel, Fernando Alonso and Michael Schumacher — are styled after traditional end-of-level video gaming bosses, with the player challenged to beat them while racing in conditions that suit each driver.

Another new mode introduced in F1 2012, is the "Season Challenge" mode. Feedback given to Codemasters was that players only played the game when they had a few hours to play. In response, Codemasters brought in this mode so that players could simply play for a short amount of time. In this mode the player will start as a team lower down the field, and over a ten race season the player will move teams mid-season, depending on their ability to beat rival drivers and objectives.

Codemasters also introduced "One-Shot Qualifying", whereby a player has a single lap to qualify for the race. The One-Shot Qualifying is included in Quick Race, Season Challenge and Career Mode. The three stage knock out session is still an option, however the single 20-minute session is no longer available in career mode. There is no longer an option to include all three practice sessions in a race weekend, but instead only a single hour session is available.

In career mode players are no longer able to play races of less than 25% length. In career mode the player can choose a team from the six teams. They are Marussia, HRT, Caterham, Scuderia Toro Rosso, Force India and Williams. The player can join a team after completing the Young Driver Test. The player can choose a team that meets the minimum medal requirements. Players get contract offers from teams as they continues their races in Career Mode.

In the quick play mode the option to make a custom championship is no longer available, but instead the player selects a single race to play on.

Reception

F1 2012 received generally favorable reviews, earning a collective score of 81 out of 100 from Metacritic. IGN gave the game a 9.0, underlining that while yearly sports releases are faced with the difficult battle of introducing new content when the sport remains relatively unchanged, F1 2012 introduced noticeable tweaks to the gameplay that steadily improved it. GameSpot were equally-complimentary (8.5/10), applauding the developer for making the game more approachable to newcomers, but bemoaning the removal of some gameplay modes that had been included in previous releases.

References

External links

2012 video games
Codemasters games
Ego (game engine) games
F1 (video game series)
Feral Interactive games
Games for Windows certified games
MacOS games
Multiplayer and single-player video games
PlayStation 3 games
Racing video games
Video games set in 2012
Video games set in Australia
Video games set in Bahrain
Video games set in Belgium
Video games set in Brazil
Video games set in Canada
Video games set in China
Video games set in Germany
Video games set in Hungary
Video games set in India
Video games set in Italy
Video games set in Japan
Video games set in Malaysia
Video games set in Monaco
Video games set in Singapore
Video games set in South Korea
Video games set in Spain
Video games set in Texas
Video games set in the United Arab Emirates
Video games set in the United Kingdom
Windows games
Xbox 360 games
Video games developed in the United Kingdom